Timothy E. Cook (1954–2006) was an American scholar of mass communications, Professor of Journalism at Louisiana State University.

Cook is known for his books on the interaction of politics and the media, and also as an influence on journalism research and education. He was best known for his widely reviewed book Governing with the News.

Books
Making Laws and Making News : Media Strategies in the U.S. House of Representatives Timothy E. Cook, Brookings Institution 1989 
Review, by L. Reisenbach, The American Political Science Review, v.84Governing with the news : the news media as a political institution by Timothy E Cook. Chicago : University of Chicago Press, ©1998 . 2nd ed., 2005
Review, by Steven Chaffee The American Political Science Review, Vol. 94, No. 3 (Sep., 2000), pp. 718–719 
Review,  by Robert Schmuhl  Commonweal,  Nov, 1998 
Review, by Brody, R. A. (1998). Public Opinion Quarterly, 62, 665–667.
Review, by Mondak, J. (1998). Political Science Quarterly, 113, 716–717.
Review, by Pippa Norris, (1999) Journal of Politics, 16, 227–230.Freeing the Presses : the First Amendment in Action  / edited by Timothy E. Cook. Baton Rouge : Louisiana State University Press, ©2005. Notes for the next epidemic. Part one: Lessons from the news coverage of AIDS'' by Timothy E Cook;  John F. Kennedy School of Government.;  Joan Shorenstein Barone Center on the Press, Politics, and Public Policy. OCLC 24785654.

References

Louisiana State University alumni
Williams College faculty
2006 deaths
1954 births
American political scientists
20th-century political scientists